The Explorer class is a series of large container ships built for CMA CGM. Advanced simulators were built to help crews learn how to handle the new ships.

The ships are mostly named after explorers. Benjamin Franklin was not an explorer but made contributions to oceanography, Georg Forster was a naturalist and ethnologist who travelled with explorer James Cook, and Jules Verne was a novelist who wrote about explorations.

Ships
There exist four different ship types within the Explorer class.

See also
 List of world's longest ships

References

Container ship classes
 
Ships of CMA CGM
Ships built by Daewoo Shipbuilding & Marine Engineering
Ships built by Samsung Heavy Industries